Miguel Schweitzer Walters (22 July 1940 – 8 May 2021) was a Chilean lawyer and diplomat.

Biography
He then earned a doctorate in criminal law in Rome. He earned the Premio Montenegro and was awarded most outstanding student in criminal law by the Instituto de Ciencias Penales de Chile. He then started working at the law firm Schweitzer & Cía, where he defended the media company .

Walters worked as a visiting professor at Stanford University, the University of California, and the University of Pennsylvania from 1969 to 1970. He then became a professor at the University of Chile and Finis Terrae University, where he became Dean of the Faculty of Law in 2003. He represented Chile on the drafting of the Código Penal Tipo para Latinoamérica.

Walters rose to power during the military dictatorship of Augusto Pinochet. He served as Ambassador of Chile to the United Nations and the Organization of American States from 1974 to 1980, and then the United Kingdom from 1980 to 1983. He was instrumental in Chile's backing of the United Kingdom during the Falklands War. He then served as Minister of Foreign Affairs from 14 February to 19 December 1983.

Miguel Schweitzer Walters died in Santiago on 8 May 2021 at the age of 80.

References

1940 births
2021 deaths
Chilean politicians
20th-century Chilean lawyers
Foreign ministers of Chile
Ambassadors of Chile to the United Kingdom
University of Chile alumni
Academic staff of the University of Chile
Stanford University faculty
University of California faculty
University of Pennsylvania faculty
People from Santiago